The following species in the grass genus Festuca, the fescues, are accepted by Plants of the World Online. This genus together with the ryegrass genus Lolium form the Festuca–Lolium complex known for its frequent hybridization, and which is further complicated by the presence of a fine-leaved fescue clade within Festuca that appears to be sister to a clade consisting of Lolium and broad-leaved Festuca species.

Festuca abyssinica 
Festuca acamptophylla 
Festuca acanthophylla 
Festuca achtarovii 
Festuca actae 
Festuca actiophyta 
Festuca acuminata 
Festuca adamovicii 
Festuca adanensis 
Festuca afghanica 
Festuca aguana 
Festuca agustini 
Festuca airoides 
Festuca akhanii 
Festuca alaica 
Festuca alatavica 
Festuca albensis 
Festuca alexeenkoi 
Festuca alfrediana 
Festuca algeriensis 
Festuca aloha 
Festuca alopecuros 
Festuca alpestris 
Festuca alpina 
Festuca altaica 
Festuca altissima 
Festuca altopyrenaica 
Festuca ambigua 
Festuca amblyodes 
Festuca amethystina 
Festuca ampla 
Festuca amplissima 
Festuca amurensis 
Festuca anatolica 
Festuca ancachsana 
Festuca andicola 
Festuca antucensis 
Festuca apuanica 
Festuca aragonensis 
Festuca archeri 
Festuca arenicola 
Festuca argentina 
Festuca argentinensis 
Festuca arizonica 
Festuca armoricana 
Festuca artvinensis 
Festuca arvernensis 
Festuca asperella 
Festuca asperula 
Festuca asplundii 
Festuca asthenica 
Festuca atlantica 
Festuca auquieri 
Festuca auriculata 
Festuca australis 
Festuca austrouralensis 
Festuca azgarica 
Festuca azucarica 
Festuca baffinensis 
Festuca bajacaliforniana 
Festuca balcanica 
Festuca bargusinensis 
Festuca bauzanina 
Festuca beamanii 
Festuca beckeri 
Festuca × belensis 
Festuca benthamiana 
Festuca bhutanica 
Festuca bidenticulata 
Festuca billyi 
Festuca boissieri 
Festuca boliviana 
Festuca borbonica 
Festuca borderei 
Festuca boriana 
Festuca borissii 
Festuca bosniaca 
Festuca boyacensis 
Festuca brachyphylla 
Festuca breistrofferi 
Festuca breviaristata 
Festuca breviglumis 
Festuca brevipaleata 
Festuca breviramea 
Festuca brevis 
Festuca brevissima 
Festuca brigantina 
Festuca bromoides 
Festuca brunnescens 
Festuca bucegiensis 
Festuca burgundiana 
Festuca burmanica 
Festuca burnatii 
Festuca bushiana 
Festuca cajamarcae 
Festuca calabrica 
Festuca calcarea 
Festuca caldasii 
Festuca californica 
Festuca callieri 
Festuca calligera 
Festuca callosa 
Festuca calva 
Festuca camerunensis 
Festuca campestris 
Festuca camusiana 
Festuca capillifolia 
Festuca cappadocica 
Festuca caprina 
Festuca carazana 
Festuca carchiensis 
Festuca carnuntina 
Festuca carpatica 
Festuca carrascana 
Festuca cartagana 
Festuca casapaltensis 
Festuca cataonica 
Festuca caucasica 
Festuca chalcophaea 
Festuca changduensis 
Festuca chasii 
Festuca chelungkingnica 
Festuca chimborazensis 
Festuca chiriquensis 
Festuca chita 
Festuca chitagana 
Festuca chodatiana 
Festuca christianii-bernardii 
Festuca chrysophylla 
Festuca chumbiensis 
Festuca chuquisacae 
Festuca cinerea 
Festuca circinata 
Festuca circummediterranea 
Festuca cirrosa 
Festuca claytonii 
Festuca cleefiana 
Festuca clementei 
Festuca coahuilana 
Festuca cochabambana 
Festuca cocuyana 
Festuca coelestis 
Festuca colombiana 
Festuca compressifolia 
Festuca confusa 
Festuca contracta 
Festuca copei 
Festuca cordubensis 
Festuca coromotensis 
Festuca costata 
Festuca costei 
Festuca coxii 
Festuca cratericola 
Festuca cretacea 
Festuca crispatopilosa 
Festuca cryptantha 
Festuca csikhegyensis 
Festuca cumminsii 
Festuca cundinamarcae 
Festuca curvula 
Festuca cuzcoensis 
Festuca cyllenica 
Festuca cynosuroides 
Festuca cyrnea 
Festuca dahurica 
Festuca dalmatica 
Festuca dasyantha 
Festuca dasyclada 
Festuca debilis 
Festuca decolorata 
Festuca deflexa 
Festuca degenii 
Festuca delicatula 
Festuca densiflora 
Festuca densipaniculata 
Festuca dentiflora 
Festuca dertosensis 
Festuca deserti 
Festuca devesae 
Festuca dichoclada 
Festuca diclina 
Festuca dimorpha 
Festuca dinirica 
Festuca discreta 
Festuca dissitiflora 
Festuca distichovaginata 
Festuca divergens 
Festuca djimilensis 
Festuca djurdjurae 
Festuca dolichantha 
Festuca dolichathera 
Festuca dolichophylla 
Festuca donax 
Festuca dracomontana 
Festuca drakensbergensis 
Festuca drymeja 
Festuca duriotagana 
Festuca durissima 
Festuca duvalii 
Festuca dyris 
Festuca earlei 
Festuca ebeliana 
Festuca edlundiae 
Festuca eggleri 
Festuca elata 
Festuca elbrusica 
Festuca elegans 
Festuca elgonensis 
Festuca elmeri 
Festuca elviae 
Festuca elwendiana 
Festuca eriobasis 
Festuca eskia 
Festuca eugenii 
Festuca exaristata 
Festuca extremiorientalis 
Festuca fabrei 
Festuca fasciculata 
Festuca fascinata 
Festuca fiebrigii 
Festuca filiformis 
Festuca fimbriata 
Festuca flacca 
Festuca flavescens 
Festuca floribunda 
Festuca forrestii 
Festuca fragilis 
Festuca francoi 
Festuca frederikseniae 
Festuca frigida 
Festuca galicicae 
Festuca galiciensis 
Festuca gamisansii 
Festuca gautieri 
Festuca geniculata 
Festuca georgii 
Festuca gilbertiana 
Festuca giraldoi 
Festuca glabrata 
Festuca glacialis 
Festuca glauca 
Festuca glaucispicula 
Festuca glumosa 
Festuca glyceriantha 
Festuca goloskokovii 
Festuca × gonzalez-ledesmae 
Festuca gracilior 
Festuca gracillima 
Festuca graeca 
Festuca grandiaristata 
Festuca gredensis 
Festuca greuteri 
Festuca × grodnensis 
Festuca guaramacalana 
Festuca gudoschnikovii 
Festuca guestfalica 
Festuca gypsophila 
Festuca × hackelii 
Festuca halleri 
Festuca hallii 
Festuca hartmannii 
Festuca hatico 
Festuca hawaiiensis 
Festuca hedbergii 
Festuca hedgei 
Festuca henriquesii 
Festuca hephaestophila 
Festuca hercegovinica 
Festuca herrerae 
Festuca heteromalla 
Festuca heteropachys 
Festuca heterophylla 
Festuca hieronymi 
Festuca hintoniana 
Festuca hircina 
Festuca hirtovaginata 
Festuca holubii 
Festuca hondae 
Festuca horridula 
Festuca horvatiana 
Festuca huamachucensis 
Festuca hubsugulica 
Festuca humbertii 
Festuca humilior 
Festuca huonii 
Festuca hyperborea 
Festuca hypsophila 
Festuca hystrix 
Festuca iberica 
Festuca idahoensis 
Festuca igoschiniae 
Festuca ilgazensis 
Festuca illyrica 
Festuca imbaburensis 
Festuca imperatrix 
Festuca inarticulata 
Festuca incurva 
Festuca incurvatifolia 
Festuca indigesta 
Festuca inguschetica 
Festuca inops 
Festuca intercedens 
Festuca iranica 
Festuca irtyshensis 
Festuca jacutica 
Festuca jaliscana 
Festuca jansenii 
Festuca japonica 
Festuca javorkae 
Festuca jeanpertii 
Festuca × jierru 
Festuca jubata 
Festuca junatovii 
Festuca juncifolia 
Festuca kamtschatica 
Festuca kansuensis 
Festuca karaginensis 
Festuca karatavica 
Festuca karavaevii 
Festuca karsiana 
Festuca kashmiriana 
Festuca kemerovensis 
Festuca killickii 
Festuca kingii 
Festuca × kolesnikovii 
Festuca kolymensis 
Festuca komarovii 
Festuca korabensis 
Festuca koritnicensis 
Festuca kozanensis 
Festuca krivotulenkoae 
Festuca kryloviana 
Festuca kuprijanovii 
Festuca kurtschumica 
Festuca kurtziana 
Festuca lachenalii 
Festuca ladyginii 
Festuca laegaardii 
Festuca laevigata 
Festuca lahonderei 
Festuca lambinonii 
Festuca lanatifolia 
Festuca lanifera 
Festuca lapidosa 
Festuca lasiorrhachis 
Festuca laxa 
Festuca lazistanica 
Festuca lemanii 
Festuca lenensis 
Festuca leptopogon 
Festuca levingei 
Festuca ligulata 
Festuca ligustica 
Festuca lilloi 
Festuca linigluma 
Festuca litardiereana 
Festuca litvinovii 
Festuca livida 
Festuca liviensis 
Festuca longiauriculata 
Festuca longifolia 
Festuca longigluma 
Festuca longiglumis 
Festuca longiligula 
Festuca longipanicula 
Festuca longipes 
Festuca longivaginata 
Festuca luciarum 
Festuca lucida 
Festuca lugens 
Festuca macedonica 
Festuca macra 
Festuca macrophylla 
Festuca madida 
Festuca magellanica 
Festuca makutrensis 
Festuca maleschevica 
Festuca marcopetrii 
Festuca marginata 
Festuca maritima 
Festuca markgrafiae 
Festuca masafuerana 
Festuca masatierrae 
Festuca matthewsii 
Festuca mekiste 
Festuca membranacea 
Festuca michaelis 
Festuca microstachys 
Festuca minutiflora 
Festuca × miscella 
Festuca modesta 
Festuca molokaiensis 
Festuca monguensis 
Festuca monticola 
Festuca morisiana 
Festuca muelleri 
Festuca multinodis 
Festuca muralis 
Festuca musbelica 
Festuca myuros 
Festuca nandadevica 
Festuca × napocae 
Festuca nardifolia 
Festuca nemoralis 
Festuca nepalica 
Festuca nereidaensis 
Festuca nevadensis 
Festuca nigrescens 
Festuca nigriflora 
Festuca niphobia 
Festuca nitida 
Festuca nitidula 
Festuca norica 
Festuca novae-zelandiae 
Festuca nubigena 
Festuca nuda 
Festuca numidica 
Festuca obturbans 
Festuca occidentalis 
Festuca occitanica 
Festuca ochroleuca 
Festuca octoflora 
Festuca oelandica 
Festuca × oenensis 
Festuca olchonensis 
Festuca olgae 
Festuca olympica 
Festuca ophioliticola 
Festuca orientalis 
Festuca orizabensis 
Festuca oroana 
Festuca × osswaldii 
Festuca ovina 
Festuca oviniformis 
Festuca × pachyphylla 
Festuca pallens 
Festuca pallescens 
Festuca pallidula 
Festuca pamirica 
Festuca pampeana 
Festuca panciciana 
Festuca panda 
Festuca paphlagonica 
Festuca papuana 
Festuca paradoxa 
Festuca parciflora 
Festuca parodiana 
Festuca parodii 
Festuca parvigluma 
Festuca parvipaleata 
Festuca parvipaniculata 
Festuca patzkei 
Festuca paucispicula 
Festuca pectinella 
Festuca penzesii 
Festuca peristerea 
Festuca perrieri 
Festuca peruviana 
Festuca petraea 
Festuca picoeuropeana 
Festuca picturata 
Festuca pilar-franceii 
Festuca pilgeri 
Festuca pilosella 
Festuca pindica 
Festuca pinifolia 
Festuca pirinica 
Festuca plebeia 
Festuca plicata 
Festuca × pocutica 
Festuca pohleana 
Festuca polita 
Festuca poluninii 
Festuca polycolea 
Festuca pontica 
Festuca popovii 
Festuca porcii 
Festuca potaninii 
Festuca presliana 
Festuca primae 
Festuca pringlei 
Festuca probatoviae 
Festuca procera 
Festuca prolifera 
Festuca prudhommei 
Festuca psammophila 
Festuca pseudeskia 
Festuca pseudodalmatica 
Festuca pseudodura 
Festuca pseudosclerophylla 
Festuca pseudosulcata 
Festuca pseudosupina 
Festuca pseudotrichophylla 
Festuca pseudovaginata 
Festuca × pseudovaria 
Festuca pseudovivipara 
Festuca pubigluma 
Festuca pubiglumis 
Festuca puccinellii 
Festuca pulchella 
Festuca pulchra 
Festuca pulveridolomiana 
Festuca punctoria 
Festuca purpurascens 
Festuca pyrenaica 
Festuca pyrogea 
Festuca quadridentata 
Festuca quadriflora 
Festuca queriana 
Festuca raddei 
Festuca rechingeri 
Festuca renvoizei 
Festuca reverchonii 
Festuca richardii 
Festuca richardsonii 
Festuca rifana 
Festuca rigescens 
Festuca rigidifolia 
Festuca rigidiuscula 
Festuca riloensis 
Festuca × ripensis 
Festuca rivularis 
Festuca robinsoniana 
Festuca roblensis 
Festuca robustifolia 
Festuca roigii 
Festuca rosei 
Festuca rothmaleri 
Festuca rubra 
Festuca rupicaprina 
Festuca rupicola 
Festuca × rurivaga 
Festuca rzedowskiana 
Festuca sabalanica 
Festuca salzmannii 
Festuca samensis 
Festuca sanctae-martae 
Festuca sanjappae 
Festuca sardoa 
Festuca saurica 
Festuca × savulescui 
Festuca saxatilis 
Festuca saximontana 
Festuca scabra 
Festuca scabriculmis 
Festuca scabrifolia 
Festuca scariosa 
Festuca schischkinii 
Festuca scholziana 
Festuca sciurea 
Festuca sclerophylla 
Festuca serana 
Festuca setifolia 
Festuca sibirica 
Festuca sicula 
Festuca sikkimensis 
Festuca simensis 
Festuca simlensis 
Festuca simpliciuscula 
Festuca sinensis 
Festuca sinomutica 
Festuca sipylea 
Festuca × sjuzevii 
Festuca skrjabinii 
Festuca skvortsovii 
Festuca sodiroana 
Festuca sommieri 
Festuca soratana 
Festuca sororia 
Festuca × soshensis 
Festuca soukupii 
Festuca spectabilis 
Festuca spiralifibrosa 
Festuca staroplaninica 
Festuca stebeckii 
Festuca steinbachii 
Festuca stenantha 
Festuca stojanovii 
Festuca stricta 
Festuca subalpina 
Festuca subantarctica 
Festuca subhirtella 
Festuca subulata 
Festuca subuliflora 
Festuca subulifolia 
Festuca subverticillata 
Festuca sudanensis 
Festuca sumapana 
Festuca sumatrana 
Festuca summilusitana 
Festuca superba 
Festuca swallenii 
Festuca talamancensis 
Festuca tancitaroensis 
Festuca tarmensis 
Festuca tatrae 
Festuca taurica 
Festuca tectoria 
Festuca teneriffae 
Festuca thracica 
Festuca thurberi 
Festuca tibetica 
Festuca ticinensis 
Festuca toca 
Festuca tolucensis 
Festuca tovarensis 
Festuca trabutii 
Festuca trachyphylla 
Festuca transcaucasica 
Festuca trichophylla 
Festuca trichovagina 
Festuca tristis 
Festuca trollii 
Festuca tschatkalica 
Festuca tschujensis 
Festuca turimiquirensis 
Festuca tzveleviana 
Festuca tzvelevii 
Festuca ulochaeta 
Festuca ultramafica 
Festuca undata 
Festuca uninodis 
Festuca uralensis 
Festuca urubambana 
Festuca ustulata 
Festuca vaginalis 
Festuca vaginata 
Festuca valdesii 
Festuca valentina 
Festuca valesiaca 
Festuca valida 
Festuca vandovii 
Festuca varia 
Festuca vasconcensis 
Festuca venezuelana 
Festuca ventanicola 
Festuca venusta 
Festuca versicolor 
Festuca versuta 
Festuca vettonica 
Festuca vierhapperi 
Festuca × vihorlatica 
Festuca violacea 
Festuca viridula 
Festuca vivipara 
Festuca viviparoidea 
Festuca vizzavonae 
Festuca vulpioides 
Festuca wagneri 
Festuca wallichiana 
Festuca washingtonica 
Festuca werdermannii 
Festuca × wettsteinii 
Festuca willdenowiana 
Festuca wolgensis 
Festuca woodii 
Festuca xanthina 
Festuca xenophontis 
Festuca yalaensis 
Festuca yemenensis 
Festuca yulungschanica 
Festuca yunnanensis 
Festuca ziganensis 
Festuca × zobelii

References

Festuca